The Kurajarra  were an Aboriginal Australian people of the Pilbara region of Western Australia.

Their existence as a people was overlooked in Norman Tindale's classic 1974 survey of Australian Aboriginal tribal groups and their language is unattested.

Country
They lived between the Nyiyaparli to their west, the Wanman to the north, the Kartudjara on their eastern and southeastern side, and the Putidjara to the south.

People
Like the Ngulipartu, the Kurajarra were a numerically small tribe which, under the stress of post-contact migrations and change, diminished rapidly, with many of them being absorbed into neighbouring tribes through intermarriage. Writing in 1989, Tonkinson stated that only a handful of descendants survived from the original tribe.

Notes

Citations

Sources

Aboriginal peoples of Western Australia
Canning Stock Route
Mid West (Western Australia)